The Alecto-class steam vessels (SV3) later reclassed as Third Class Sloops, were designed by Sir William Symonds, the Surveyor of the Navy. The design was approved on 12 April 1839. Initially four vessels were ordered and completed. A fifth unit was ordered (Rattler), but was reordered as a screw propelled vessel. And a sixth unit had been ordered but was requested to be reordered to a different design. The screw driven Rattler participated in the first of three 'tug o- wars with the Alecto. The vessels all participated during the Russian War. All had gone to the breakers by the mid-1860s.

Alecto was the second named vessel since it was used for a 12-gun fireship, launched by King of Dover on 26 May 1781 and sold in 1802.

Ardent was the fifth named vessel since it was used for a 64-gun third rate, launched at Blaydes of Hull on 13 August 1764, captured by the French off Plymouth on 17 August 1779, recaptured in April 1782 and renamed Tiger then sold in June 1794.

Prometheus was the second named vessel since it was used for an 18-gun fireship, Launched by Thompson of Southampton on 27 March 1807, assigned to harbour service in May 1819, then renamed Veteran on 2 May 1839 and broken in August 1852.

Polyphemus was the second named vessel since it was used for a 64-gun third rate, launched at Sheerness Dockyard on 27 April 1782, converted to a powder hulk in September 1813 and her breaking was completed at Chatham on 15 September 1827.

Design and specifications
The vessels were ordered in February 1839. The first two were laid down in July 1839 at Chatham and Sheerness Dockyards. The second pair were laid down at Chatham Dockyard in February 1840. The first two vessels (Alecto and Prometheus) were launched in July 1839 with Polyphemus launched in September 1840 and Ardent in February 1841. The builder's measure calculated at  tons whereas the vessels displaced 878 tons.

Seaward and Capel of Millwall supplied the machinery for all vessels. They were equipped with two fire-tube rectangular boilers. The engines were 2-cylinder vertical single expansion (VSE) direct acting steam engines rated at 200 nominal horsepower (NHP).

All four ships were armed with two 32-pounder 42 hundredweight (cwt) muzzle loading smooth bore ( MLSB) guns on pivot mounts and two 32-pounder (25 cwt) MLSB carronades on broadside trucks.

Initial cost of vessels
Alecto: Total Cost £27,268 (including Machinery - £10,700)
Ardent: Total Cost £28,593 (Hull - £13,385; Machinery - £10,700; Fitting - £4,061)
Prometheus: Total Cost £29,433 (including Machinery - £10,700)
Polyphemus: Total Cost £27,596 (Hull - £13,198; Machinery - £10,700; Fitting - £3,698)

Notes

Citations

References
 Lyon Winfield, The Sail & Steam Navy List, All the Ships of the Royal Navy 1815 to 1889, by David Lyon & Rif Winfield, published by Chatham Publishing, London © 2004, 
 Winfield, British Warships in the Age of Sail (1817 – 1863), by Rif Winfield, published by Seaforth Publishing, England © 2014, e, Chapter 11 Steam Paddle Vessels, Vessels acquired since November 1830, Stromboli Class
 Colledge, Ships of the Royal Navy, by J.J. Colledge, revised and updated by Lt Cdr Ben Warlow and Steve Bush, published by Seaforth Publishing, Barnsley, Great Britain, © 2020, e  (EPUB)
 The Navy List, published by His Majesty's Stationery Office, London

Paddle sloops of the Royal Navy
Sloop classes